Matija is a South Slavic masculine and feminine given name, a variant of Matthew. Notable people with the name include:

 Matija Ahacel (1779–1845), Carinthian Slovene philologist, publicist, and collector of folk songs
 Matija Antun Relković (1732–1798), Habsburg military officer and Croatian writer
 Matija Babić (born 1978), Croatian journalist and entrepreneur
 Matija Ban (1818–1903), Serbian poet, dramatist, and playwright
 Matija Barl (born 1940), Slovene actor, producer and translator
 Matija Bećković (born 1939), Serbian writer and poet
 Matija Bertolloti, Slovenian politician
 Matija Bravničar (1897–1977), Slovenian composer
 Matija Čanić (1901–1964), Croatian military officer
 Matija Češković (born 1981), Croatian basketball guard
 Matija Christian, Slovenian politician
 Matija Čop (1797–1835), Slovene linguist, literary historian and critic
 Matija Di Georgio, Slovenian politician
 Matija Divković (1563–1631), Bosnian Franciscan writer
 Matija Duh (1989–2013), Slovenian international motorcycle speedway rider
 Matija Đulvat (born 1976), Croatian futsal player
 Matija Dvorneković (born 1989), Croatian football forward
 Matija Gogala (born 1937), Slovene entomologist
 Matija Gubec (c. 1548–1573), Croatian revolutionary
 Matija Ivanić (1445–1523), leader of the Hvar Rebellion
 Matija Jama (1872–1947), Slovene painter
 Matija Kluković (born 1982), Croatian independent film director
 Matija Kranjc (born 1984), Slovenian javelin thrower
 Matija Kristić (born 1978), Croatian football defender
 Matija Kvasina (born 1981), Croatian racing cyclist
 Matija Ljubek (1953–2000), Croatian sprint canoeist
 Matija Ljujić (born 1993), Serbian football midfielder
 Matija Majar (1809–1892), Slovene Roman Catholic priest and political activist
 Matija Matko (born 1982), Croatian football player
 Matija Mazarek (born 1726) Catholic priest
 Matija Mažuranić (1817–1881), Croatian writer
 Matija Mesić (1826–1878), Croatian historian and professor
 Matija Murko (1861–1952), Slovene scholar
 Matija Nastasić (born 1993), Serbian professional footballer
 Matija Nenadović (1777–1854), Serbian archpriest
 Matija Petar Katančić (1750–1825), Croatian writer, professor of aesthetics and archaeology, and lexicographer
 Matija Pintarič (born 1989), Slovenian ice hockey goaltender
 Matija Popović (c. 1490-1563), Serbian Orthodox priest from Ottoman Bosnia
 Matija Protić (born 1994), Serbian football midfielder
 Matija Prskalo (born 1966), Croatian theatre, film and television actress
 Mattia Prskalo (born 1986), Swedish male model
 Matija Sabančić (fl. 1463–1471), King of Bosnia
 Matija Šegavac (born 1995), Serbian football goalkeeper
 Matija Šestak (born 1972), Slovenian sprinter
 Matija Širok (born 1991), Slovenian footballer
 Matija Škarabot (born 1988), Slovenian footballer
 Matija Škerbec (1886–1963), Slovene Roman Catholic priest, political figure, and writer
 Matija Skurjeni (1898–1990), Croatian painter associated with the naïve art movement
 Matija Smrekar (born 1989), Croatian footballer
 Matija Špičić (born 1988), Croatian footballer
 Matija Vojsalić, member of the Bosnian Hrvatinić noble family
 Matija Vuković (1925–1985), Serbian sculptor
 Matija Zmajević (1680–1735), Russian admiral and shipbuilder

See also
 
Matej
Matijević
 Matyáš
 Mate (given name)

Croatian masculine given names
Serbian masculine given names
Slovene masculine given names